Aletia is a genus of owlet moths of the family Noctuidae described by Jacob Hübner in 1821.

New Zealand species 
In 2019 Robert Hoare undertook a major review of New Zealand Noctuidae. During this review the genus Ichneutica was greatly expanded and the genus Aletia was subsumed into that genus as a synonym.

Species
Some species of this genus are:

Aletia amlaki (Laporte, 1984)
Aletia angustipennis (Saalmüller, 1891)
Aletia ankaratra Rungs, 1956
Aletia circulus (Saalmüller, 1880)
Aletia consanguis (Guenée, 1852)
Aletia cuneata Philpott, 1916
Aletia decaryi (Boursin & Rungs, 1952)
Aletia duplex Rungs, 1956
Aletia elisa (Berio, 1962)
Aletia evoei (Laporte, 1974)
Aletia fallaciosa (Rungs, 1956)
Aletia flavalba (Berio, 1970)
Aletia graditornalis (Berio, 1970)
Aletia heimi Rungs, 1956
Aletia inframicans (Hampson, 1893)
Aletia infrargyrea (Saalmüller, 1891)
Aletia laevusta (Berio, 1955)
Aletia milloti (Rungs, 1956)
Aletia mollis (Berio, 1974)
Aletia mvakoumelensis (Laporte, 1973)
Aletia octogesima (Wiltshire, 1982)
Aletia operosa (Saalmüller, 1891)
Aletia panarista (D. S. Fletcher, 1963)
Aletia phaeopasta (Hampson, 1907)
Aletia provvisoria (Berio, 1962)
Aletia pseudotacuna (Berio, 1962)
Aletia pyrausta (Hampson, 1913)
Aletia tincta (Walker, 1858)
Aletia toumodi (Laporte, 1978)
Aletia viettei (Rungs, 1956)
Aletia vuattouxi (Laporte, 1973)

References

Hadeninae
Noctuoidea genera